Maritime State University (MSU) is a maritime university in Russia. It is named after G.I. Nevelskoi, in its full Russian name. The university aims to provide specialisation in maritime transport systems in the spheres of natural science, the humanities, technical and marine conventional trends.

Twelve scientific schools are working in the sphere of marine and engineers elaboration within the university. MSU prepares engineer-technical staff of 28 specialisations and specialties. MSU includes eleven institutes, sixteen faculties, the Maritime College, Human-Technical Lyceum, lyceum classes, and the School of Young Sailors and Kids' Studio.

Structure
 The Institute "Maritime Academy";
 The Institute of Automation and Information Technologies;
 Maritime Technological Institute;
 Institute of Management;
 Sea Protection Institute;
 The Institute of Social and Political problems of Management;
 The Institute of Eastern Asia;
 Open Maritime Institute;
 Maritime Physics-Technological Institute;
 The Institute of Higher Qualification.

University resources

MSU has seven academic buildings, forty-six laboratories and studies, libraries, and ten professional training centers imitating ship equipment. MSU has a student cafeteria with two thousand seats, a medical center, eight dormitories for students, a swimming pool, a summer camp in Narva Bay, and a yacht club.

MSU is one of the founders of the Pacific Ocean Law Institute. The university conducts research on complex transport problems. Since 1997, the university organises research on the sailing boat Nadezhda together with Moscow and Saint Petersburg universities.

Since 1992, the university has its own shipping company FESMA, a training boat named Nadezhda, a cargo training ship named Vitya Chalenko, and a fishing boat named "Professor Phrolov". Senior students have navigation practice on ships of the Far Eastern Shipping Company. There is a special kids' studio and the club "Moreckhod" in the university for professional guidance. There are special lyceum classes for teenagers in Vladivostok and some towns of the Prymorskyi region, such as Artyom, Arsenyev, Kirovka, and Nakhodka.

University sports
MSU has about twenty sport sections: swimming, volleyball, mini-football, shooting, various kinds of wrestling, tennis, ship design sports, among others.

The university usually organises open rowing and sailing regattas for the Admiral G.I. Nevelskoi Cup in Spring and Autumn. About three hundred sportsmen take part in these regattas.

Expedition yacht Admiral Nevelskoi

In July 1993, Professor Leonid Lysenko set out on a solo circumnavigation in the university's  Polish-built yacht Admiral Nevelskoi, calling initially in Taiwan, Hong Kong, the Aleutian Islands and California. In 1997 the hull of a yacht was found drifting off Rodrigues Island, near Mauritius and brought ashore. After 2010, when the wreck was identified as the missing yacht, a proposal was developed for its restoration and the establishment of a private "Admiral Nevelskoi Maritime Museum" on Rodrigues.

International cooperation
Mutual cooperation of Pacific-Asian region countries have a good influence on the development of international relationships. Partners of MSU include some universities in China, Australian Maritime College, California State University Maritime Academy, Mokpo National Maritime University, Korea Maritime and Ocean University, and University of Trade Fleet, Tokyo. MSU also has student exchanges with universities of the Toyama Prefecture.

References

External links
 Maritime State University official website (in Russian)
 Maritime State University official website (in English)

Universities in Vladivostok
Maritime colleges in Russia